This is a bibliography of notable works on New Brunswick, Canada.

Bibliography

Surveys
  McNutt, W.S.  New Brunswick: A history: 1784-1867 MacMillan, 1963 (still the standard history). 496 pp.
  MacFarlane, William G.  New Brunswick Bibliography: The books and writers of the province. Saint John, 1895.

Localities
  Belliveau, Edward. Running Far In: Story of Shediac. Hantsport: Lancelot Press, 1977. 262 pp.
  Bowser, Reginald B.  Dorchester Island and Related Areas. Self-published, 1986. 179 pp.
  Cooney, R.  A compendious history of the northern part of the province of New Brunswick and of the District of Gaspé in Lower Canada. Halifax: Joseph Howe, 1832.
  Hebb, Ross N. Quaco - St. Martins: A brief history. Fredericton: Quaco / Springhill Press, 1997. 162 pp.
  Larracy, Edward. Chocolate River: a Story of the Petitcodiac River. Hantsport: Lancelot Press, 1985. 254 pp.
  Milner, W.C. History of Sackville. Tribune Press, 1934 (reprinted several times thereafter). 172 pp.
  Machum, Lloyd A. A History of Moncton: Town and City 1885-1965, The City of Moncton., 1965
  Mowat, Grace Helen. The Diverting History of a Loyalist Town: A portrait of St. Andrews, New Brunswick. Fredericton: Brunswick Press, 1953 (reprinted 1976). 152 pp.
  Nowlan, Alden, Campobello: The Outer Island. Toronto: Clarke, Irwin, 1975.
  Trueman, Howard.  The Chignecto Isthmus: And its first settlers. Toronto: William Briggs, 1902 (reprinted by Mika Publishing, Belleville, 1975). 278 pp.
  Ward, Jeffrey P. Head of the Bay: A history of the Maringouin Peninsula, Bay of Fundy, Canada, Sackville: Tantramar Heritage Trust, 2009, 240 pp.

Special topics
 Campey, Lucille H. Planters, Paupers, and Pioneers: English Settlers in Atlantic Canada (2010)
 Campey, Lucille H. With Axe and Bible: The Scottish Pioneers of New Brunswick, 1784-1874 (Dundurn, 2007)
  Cunningham, Robert, and John B. Prince.  Tamped Clay and Saltmarsh Hay (Artifacts of New Brunswick). Brunswick Press 1976. 280 pp.
  Facey-Crowther, David.  The New Brunswick Militia, 1787-1867. New Brunswick Historical Society / New Ireland Press, 1990. 191 pp.
  Ganong, W. F. A Monograph on the Place-Nomenclature of the Province of New Brunswick Toronto: Copp-Clark. 1896
 Lawrence, Joseph Wilson. The Judges of New Brunswick and their Times Fredericton: Acadiensis, 1985 (reprinted from several issues of Acadiensis between 1905 and 1907, having been written in the 1880s). 552 pp.
  Leroux, John. Building New Brunswick: An architectural history. Fredericton: Goose Lane, 2008. 310 pp.
  Martin, Gwen L., Gesner's Dream: The trials and triumphs of early mining in New Brunswick, Canadian Institute of Mining, Metallurgy and Petroleum - New Brunswick Branch, 2003. 328 pp.
 Stewart, Dr. W.B., Medicine in New Brunswick, Moncton: New Brunswick Medical Society, 1974. 413 pp.
  Toner, Peter M.  New Ireland Remembered: Historical Essays on the Irish in New Brunswick. Fredericton: New Ireland Press, 1988. 188 pp.

Pre 1784
Prior to 1784, New Brunswick was a part of Nova Scotia, and before that, of Acadia. It was originally settled by the Mi'Kmaq and Maliseet tribes.

General
  Gwyn, Julian.  Excessive Expectations: Maritime Commerce and the Economic Development of Nova Scotia, 1740-1870 McGill-Queen's University Press, 1998. 291 pp.
  Whitelaw, William Menzies; The Maritimes and Canada before Confederation (1934) online

Pre-Columbian era
 Davis, Stephen A. Míkmaq: Peoples of the Maritimes, Nimbus Publishing, 1998.

Acadian era (1604-1755)
  Brebner, John Bartlet. New England's Outpost: Acadia before the conquest of Canada. New York: Columbia University Press, 1927. 291 pp.
  
  
  Hand, Chris M., The Siege of Fort Beausejour, Fredericton: Goose Lane Editions and the New Brunswick Military Heritage Project, 2004. 109 pp.
  Lanctôt, Léopold.  L'Acadie des Origines, 1603-1771 Montreal: Fleuve, 1988. 234 pp.
  LeBlanc, Ronnie-Gilles (2005). Du Grand Dérangement à la Déportation: Nouvelles Perspectives Historiques. Moncton: Université de Moncton, 465 pages (book in French and English)

Foreign Protestants (1753-1766)
  Bell, Winthrop P.  The "Foreign Protestants" and the Settlement of Nova Scotia: The History of a Piece of Arrested British Colonial Policy in the Eighteenth Century. (1961). reprint Fredericton, N.B.: Acadiensis for Mount Allison U., Cen. for Can. Studies, 1990. 673 pp.
  Hempel, Rainer L. New Voices on the Shores: Early Pennsylvania German Settlements in New Brunswick. Toronto: German-Canadian Historical Association, 2000.486 pp.

New England Planters (1759-1766)
  Brebner, John Bartlet. The Neutral Yankees of Nova Scotia: A Marginal Colony During the Revolutionary Years (1937)
  Clarke, Ernest. The Siege of Fort Cumberland: An episode in the American Revolution. McGill-Queen's University Press, 1995. 302 pp.
  Conrad, Margaret, ed.  They Planted Well: New England Planters in Maritime Canada. Fredericton: Acadiensis, 1988. 321 pp.
  Conrad, Margaret, ed.  Making Adjustments: Change and Continuity in Planter Nova Scotia, 1759-1800. Fredericton: Acadiensis, 1991. 280 pp.
  Conrad, Margaret, ed. Intimate Relations: Family and Community in Planter Nova Scotia, 1759-1800. Fredericton: Acadiensis, 1995. 298 pp.
  Conrad, Margaret and Moody, Barry, ed.  Planter Links: Community and Culture in Colonial Nova Scotia. Fredericton: Acadiensis, 2001. 236 pp.
  Donald A. Desserud; "Outpost's Response: The Language and Politics of Moderation in Eighteenth-Century Nova Scotia" American Review of Canadian Studies, Vol. 29, 1999  online
  Stewart, Gordon, and George Rawlyk, A People Highly Favoured of God: The Nova Scotia Yankees and the American Revolution. Toronto: MacMillan, 1972. 219 pp.

1784 - 1900
  Beavan, Mrs. Francis.  Life in the Backwoods of New Brunswick. London: Routledge, 1845 (reprinted 1980 by Print 'n' Press, Fredericton), 142 pp.
  Marquis, Greg. In Armageddon's Shadow: The Civil War and Canada's Maritime Provinces, McGill-Queen's University Press, 1998. 389 pp.
  Smith, Joshua M.  Borderland Smuggling: Patriots, loyalists and illicit trade in the Northeast, 1783-1820, University Press of Florida, 2006, 160 pp.
  Steeves, Helen Harper, The Story of Moncton's First Store and Storekeeper. Saint John: J & A. MacMillan, 1924. 178 pp.
  Stewart, George. The Story of the Great Fire in St. John, N.B., June 20th, 1877, Toronto: Belford Brothers, 1877. online
  Temperley, Howard.  Gubbins' New Brunswick Journals, 1811 & 1813. Fredericton: New Brunswick Heritage Publications, 1980. 92 pp.
  Wilson, Barry K, Benedict Arnold: A traitor in our midst, Montreal and Kingston: McGill-Queen's University Press. 2001. 270 pp.
  Wynn, Graeme.  Timber Colony: A historical geography of early nineteenth century New Brunswick. University of Toronto Press, 1981. 224 pp.

Since 1900
  Doyle, Arthur T.  Front Benches and Back Rooms: A story of corruption, muckraking, raw partisanship and political intrigue in New Brunswick [1908 - 1935]. Toronto: Green Tree, 1976. 306 pp.
  How, Douglas and Ralph Costello, K.C.: The biography of K.C. Irving Toronto: Key Porter Books, 1993. 400 pp.

See also

Bibliography of Canadian provinces and territories

External links 
Provincial Archives of New Brunswick 
Archives & Special Collections - University of New Brunswick
Bibliography of Books and Articles - St. Thomas University
Council of Archives New Brunswick - (CANB)
Archives & Research Library - New Brunswick Museum

 
New Brunswick